Avaris (Egyptian: ḥw.t wꜥr.t, sometimes hut-waret; ;) was the Hyksos capital of Egypt located at the modern site of Tell el-Dab'a in the northeastern region of the Nile Delta. As the main course of the Nile migrated eastward, its position at the hub of Egypt's delta emporia made it a major capital suitable for trade. It was occupied from about the 18th century BC until its capture by Ahmose I.

Etymology

The name in the Egyptian language of the 2nd millennium BC was probably pronounced *Ḥaʔət-Waʕrəʔ “House of the Region” and denotes the capital of an administrative division of the land (wʕr.t). Today, the name Hawara survives, referring to the site at the entrance to Faiyum. Alternatively, Clement of Alexandria referred to the name of this city as "Athyria".

Excavations

In 1885, the Swiss Édouard Naville started the first excavations in the area around Tell-el-Daba. Between 1941 and 1942, Labib Habachi, an Egyptian Egyptologist first forwarded the idea that the site could be identified with Avaris. Between 1966 and 1969 and since 1975, the site has been excavated by the Austrian Archaeological Institute. Using radar imaging technology, its scientists could identify in 2010 the outline of the city including streets, houses, a port, and a side arm of the River Nile passing through the city.

The site at Tell el-Dab'a, covering an area of about 2 square kilometers, is in ruins today, but excavations have shown that, at one point, it was a well-developed center of trade with a busy harbour catering to over 300 ships during a trading season.  Artifacts excavated at a temple erected in the Hyksos period have produced goods from all over the Aegean world. The temple even has Minoan-like wall paintings that are similar to those found on Crete at the Palace of Knossos. A large mudbrick tomb has also been excavated to the west of the temple, where grave goods, such as copper swords, have been found.

History

The site was originally founded by Amenemhat I on the eastern branch of the Nile in the Delta. Its close proximity to Asia made it a popular town for Asiatic immigrants. Many of these immigrants were from Palestine and they were culturally Egyptianized, using Egyptian pottery, but also retained many aspects of their own culture, as can be seen from the various Asiatic burials including weapons of Syro-Palestinian origin. One palatial district appears to have been abandoned as a result of an epidemic during the 13th dynasty. In the 18th century BC, the Hyksos conquered Lower Egypt and set up Avaris as their capital. Kamose, the last pharaoh of the Seventeenth Dynasty, besieged Avaris but was unable to defeat the Hyksos there. A few decades later, Ahmose I captured Avaris and overran the Hyksos. Canaanite-style artifacts dated to the Tuthmosid or New Kingdom period suggest that a large part of the city's Semitic population remained in residence following its reconquest by the Egyptians. The pharaohs of the Eighteenth Dynasty set up a capital in Thebes and the palatial complex at Avaris was briefly abandoned, but areas such as the Temple of Seth and G6 region remained continuously occupied. After Ramesses II constructed the city of Pi-Ramesses roughly 2km to the north and "superseding Avaris", large portions of the former site of Avaris were used by the inhabitants of Pi-Ramesses as a cemetery and part of it was used as a major navy base, while the "Harbor of Avaris" toponym continued to be used for Avaris' harbor through the Ramesside period. The name "Avaris" is also referred to in Papyrus Sallier I in the late 13th century BC. In addition, the 'Avaris' toponym is also known to Manetho in the 3rd century BC, quoted by Josephus in his Against Apion 1.14.

Urban chronology
Stratiagraphic layers M-N  
Amenemhet I (12th dynasty) planned a settlement, called  Hutwaret  located in the 19th Nome, circa 1930 BC. It was a small Egyptian town until about 1830 BC when it began to grow by immigration of Canaanites (Levant Middle Bronze Age IIA) By 1800 BC it was a much larger trade colony under Egyptian control.  Over the next 100 years immigration increased the size of the city. Scarabs with the name "Retjenu" have been found in Avaris, also dating to the 12th Dynasty (1991-1802 BCE).  
Stratiagraphic layers G
At about 1780 a temple to Set was built.  The Canaanites living at Avaris considered the Egyptian god Set to be the Canaanite god Hadad.  Both had dominion over the weather.
Stratiagraphic layers F
Around 1700 BC  a temple district to Canaanite Asherah and Egyptian Hathor was built in the eastern part of the city.  From 1700 onward social stratification begins and an elite arise.
Stratiagraphic layers E
In 1650 the Hyksos arrive and the city grows to 250 ha.  It is believed that Avaris was the largest city in the world from 1670 to 1557 BC.  A large citadel was built around 1550.

Minoan connection

Avaris, along with Tel Kabri in Israel and Alalakh in Syria, also has a record of Minoan civilization, which is otherwise quite rare in the Levant. Manfred Bietak, an Austrian archaeologist and the excavator of Tell Dab'a, has speculated that there was close contact with the rulers of Avaris, and that the large building featuring the frescoes allowed the Minoans to have a ritual life in Egypt. French archaeologist Yves Duhoux proposed the existence of a Minoan 'colony' on an island in the Nile delta.

See also
 List of ancient Egyptian towns and cities
 List of historical capitals of Egypt

References

Bibliography

Pierce, R.W., Entry on "Rameses" in

External links

 Tell el-Dabʿa Homepage - available in German and English

Populated places established in the 2nd millennium BC
Populated places disestablished in the 2nd millennium BC
Cities in ancient Egypt
Hyksos cities in ancient Egypt
Archaeological sites in Egypt
Former populated places in Egypt
Nile Delta
Minoan archaeology
Tells (archaeology)
1885 archaeological discoveries
Former capitals of Egypt